Moore's Mill may refer to:
Battle of Moore's Mill in the American Civil War
Moores Mill, Alabama
Historic mills of the Atlanta area#Moore's Mill

See also
Moores Mills (disambiguation)